Alberto Conrad Machuca (born March 26, 1910, date of death unknown) was a Bolivian freestyle swimmer who competed in the 1936 Summer Olympics. He was the first ever Olympic competitor for Bolivia and the Bolivian flag bearer at the Berlin Games. At the swimming competitions he was eliminated in the first round of the 100 metre freestyle event.

External links
Alberto Conrad's profile at Sports Reference.com

1910 births
Year of death missing
Bolivian male swimmers
Olympic swimmers of Bolivia
Swimmers at the 1936 Summer Olympics
20th-century Bolivian people